Queen Sinjeong (Hangul: 신정왕후, Hanja: 神貞王后; 21 January 1809 – 4 June 1890), also known as Queen Dowager Hyoyu (효유왕대비), of the Pungyang Jo clan, was the only wife of Crown Prince Hyomyeong and mother of Heonjong of Joseon. She served as nominal regent during Gojong's minority, between 1864–1873, although she left all de facto power to the King's father, Heungseon Daewongun, and only kept the formal title.

Life
Lady Jo was born on 21 January 1809 into the Pungyang Jo clan to Jo Man-yeong and Lady Song of the Eunjin Song clan during King Sunjo's 8th year of reign. Through her paternal great-grandmother, Lady Jo is a first cousin twice removed of Lady Hyegyeong; who is the grandmother of her future father-in-law, King Sunjo. 

In 1819, she became Crown Princess Consort when she married Crown Prince Hyomyeong, thus granting her mother the royal title of “Internal Princess Consort Deokan” (덕안부부인, 德安府夫人) and her father, “Internal Prince Pungeun” (풍은부원군, 豊恩府院君). The Crown Princess Consort gave birth to her only son, the future King Heonjeong, on 8 September 1827. 

From 1827, her husband had acted as regent for his father when he was ill, but died at the age of 20 in 1830. Her father-in-law King Sunjo soon followed and died from his illness in 1834.

In 1834, the Jo clan seized control over the royal court from the Andong Kim clan. The clan rose to prominence, pushing out the Andong Kim clan that had wielded power since the King Sunjo regime. 

Her son, Heonjong of Joseon, became king in 1834 and that same year, her mother died. Through the influence of her mother-in-law, Queen Sunwon, her son married in 1837 to a daughter from her clan, the Andong Kim. She was posthumously honored as Queen Hyohyeon after she died in 1843 at the age of 15.

After the mourning period, her son eventually remarried in 1844 to a daughter from the Namyang Hong clan. However, with the death of the clan leader Jo Man-yeong, the Queen Dowager’s father, in 1846, control of the kingdom once again fell into the hands of the Andong Kim clan. 

Anti-Catholic in nature, the Pungyang Jo clan dominated the court when King Heonjeong blamed the Andong Kim clan for being soft on Catholics and launched a persecution, killing hundreds of Catholics, including three French missionary priests.

Her son died childless on 25 July 1849, and was succeeded by a distant relative, Cheoljong of Joseon three days later on 28 July. After the death of her son, she was given the title Grand Queen Dowager Hyoyu.

In January 1864, King Cheoljong died without an heir. The selection of the next king was in the hands of three dowagers: Queen Dowager Hyoyu, mother of King Heonjong; Queen Dowager Myeongheon, King Heonjong’s second wife; and Queen Dowager Myeongsun, Cheoljong's wife. 

Queen Cheorin, the queen consort of Cheoljong and a member of the Andong Kim clan, claimed the right to choose the next king, although traditionally, the eldest queen dowager is the one with the authority to select the new king. Cheoljong’s second cousin, Grand Queen Dowager Hyoyu, who too had risen to prominence by intermarriage with the Yi family, currently held this title.

The "designated right" resided with Grand Queen Dowager Sinjeong, as she was the oldest of the dowagers.

Queen Sinjeong saw an opportunity to advance the cause of the Pungyang Jo clan, the only true rival of the Andong Kim clan in Korean politics. As Cheoljong fell deeper under his illness, the Grand Queen Dowager was approached by Yi Ha-eung, a descendant of King Injo (r.1623–1649), whose father was made an adoptive son of Prince Eunsin, a nephew of King Yeongjo (r.1724–1776). 

The branch that Yi Ha-eung's family belonged to was an obscure line of descent of the Yi clan, which survived the often deadly political intrigue that frequently embroiled the Joseon court by forming no affiliation with any factions. Yi Ha-eung himself was ineligible for the throne due to a law that dictated that any possible heir to the kingdom be part of the generation after the most recent incumbent of the throne, but his second son Yi Myeong-bok, later Emperor Gojong, was a possible successor to the throne.

The Pungyang Jo clan saw that Yi Myeong-bok was only twelve years old and would not be able to rule in his own name until he came of age, and that they could easily influence Yi Ha-eung, who would be acting as regent for the future king. As soon as news of Cheoljong's death reached Yi Ha-eung through his intricate network of spies in the palace, he and the Pungyang Jo clan took the hereditary royal seal — an object that was considered necessary for a legitimate reign to take place and aristocratic recognition to be received — effectively giving her absolute power to select the successor to the throne. By the time Cheoljong's death had become a known fact, the Andong Kim clan was powerless according to law as the seal lay in the hands of the Grand Queen Dowager Sinjeong.

In an apocryphal story, Queen Cheorin sent a minister to fetch the son of Yi Ha-eung, eleven-year-old Yi Myeong-bok, who was flying a kite in a palace garden. The son was brought to the palace in a sedan chair, where Queen Sinjeong rushed forward and called him her son, thus producing the new Joseon king, King Gojong, adopted son of Crown Prince Hyomyeong.  This story may or may not be true.

These facts, however, are known to be correct. On 16 January 1864, Yi Myeong-bok was appointed the Prince of Ikseong by Dowager Queen Sinjeong. The next day, his father was granted the title Heungseon Daewongun. On 21 January, Yi Myeong-bok was enthroned as King Gojong, and Dowager Queen Sinjeong began her regency. Yi was apparently chosen because "he was the only suitable surviving male member of the Yi clan and closest by blood to the royal house".

Since Gojong was so young, Queen Sinjeong invited the Daewongun to assist his son in ruling. She virtually renounced her right to be regent in 1866, and though she remained the titular regent, the Daewongun was in fact the true ruler.

But when the Grand Queen Dowager stepped down from regency, Grand Internal Prince Heungseon had immediately started to drive out the influence of the Jo clan. This eventually brought in her adoptive daughter-in-law Queen Min’s intervention as she became involved in Royal politics. Thus bringing down the power and influence of the king’s father and his supporters, and becoming regent while also bringing in the influence of her family, the Yeoheung Min clan.

Queen Sinjeong died on 4 June 1890 during Gojong's 27th year of reign. Nine years after her death, during the 3rd year reign of Emperor Gwangmu, she was given the posthumous title of "Empress Shinjeongik (Hangul: 신정익황후, Hanja: 神貞翼皇后), and Crown Prince Hyomyeong was given the posthumous title of "Emperor Munjoik" (Hangul: 문조익황제, Hanja: 文祖翼皇帝).

Family
 Great-great-great-grandfather
 Jo Do-bo (조도보, 趙道輔)
 Great-great-great-grandmother
 Lady Kim of the Gyeongju Kim clan (본관: 경주 김씨, 金氏); daughter of Kim Pil-jin (김필진, 金必鎭)
 Great-great-grandfather
 Jo Sang-gyeong (조상경, 趙尙絅)
 Great-great-grandmother
 Lady Yi of the Bupyeong Yi clan (본관: 부평 이씨, 李氏); daughter of Yi Jeong-tae (이정태, 李廷泰)
 Great-grandfather
 Jo Eom (조엄, 趙曮) (1719 - 1777); brought sweet potato seeds in 1763, during King Yeongjo's 39th year of reign
 Great-grandmother
 Lady Hong of the Pungsan Hong clan (홍씨, 洪氏) (1717 - 1808); daughter of Hong Hyeon-bo (홍현보, 洪鉉輔)
 Grandfather
 Jo Jin-gwan (1739 - 1808) (조진관, 趙鎭寬)
 Grandmother
 Lady Hong of the Namyang Hong clan (남양 홍씨, 南陽 洪氏) (1739 - 1799); daughter of Hong Ik-bin (홍익빈, 洪益彬)
 Father
 Jo Man-yeong (1776 - 1846) (조만영, 趙萬永)
 Aunt: Lady Jo of the Pungyang Jo clan (본관: 풍양 조씨, 豊壤 趙氏)
 Uncle: Yun Gyeong-ryeol (윤경렬, 尹慶烈) of the Haepyeong Yun clan (해평 윤씨, 海平 尹氏)
 Aunt: Lady Jo of the Pungyang Jo clan (본관: 풍양 조씨, 豊壤 趙氏)
 Uncle: Yi Jae-mun (이재문, 李在文) of Yongin Yi clan (용인 이씨, 龍仁 李氏)
 Uncle: Jo Won-yeong (조원영, 趙原永) (1777 - 1825); became the adopted son of his uncle Jo Jin-ui (조진의, 趙鎭宜)
 Aunt: Lady Han (한씨, 韓氏); daughter of Han Yong-gu (한용구, 韓用龜)
 Uncle: Jo In-yeong (조인영, 趙寅永) (1782 - 1850)
 Aunt: Lady Kim of the (new) Andong Kim clan (신 안동 김씨, 新 安東 金氏)
 Cousin: Lady Jo of the Pungyang Jo clan (본관: 풍양 조씨, 豊壤 趙氏)
 Cousin-in-law: Kim Hak-seong (김학성, 金學性) of the Cheongpung Kim clan (청풍 김씨, 淸風 金氏)
 Cousin: Lady Jo of the Pungyang Jo clan (본관: 풍양 조씨, 豊壤 趙氏)
 Cousin-in-law: Yi In-woo (이인우, 李寅禹) of the Jeonju Yi clan (전주 이씨, 全州 李氏)
 Cousin: Lady Jo of the Pungyang Jo clan (본관: 풍양 조씨, 豊壤 趙氏)
 Cousin-in-law: Seo Ik-bo (서익보, 徐翼輔) of the Daegu Seo clan (대구 서씨, 大丘 徐氏)
 Aunt: Lady Jo of the Pungyang Jo clan (본관: 풍양 조씨, 豊壤 趙氏)
 Uncle: Yi Bok-yeon (이복연, 李復淵) of the Jeonju Yi clan (전주 이씨, 全州 李氏)
 Aunt: Lady Jo of the Pungyang Jo clan (본관: 풍양 조씨, 豊壤 趙氏)
 Uncle: Kim Byeong-mun (김병문, 金炳文) of the (new) Andong Kim clan (신 안동 김씨, 新 安東 金氏)
 Mother
 Internal Princess Consort Deokan of the Eunjin Song clan (덕안부부인 송씨, 德安府夫人 宋氏) (1776 - 1834)
 Grandfather: Song Si-yeon (송시연, 宋時淵)
 Grandmother: Lady Kim of the Andong Kim clan (안동 김씨, 安東 金氏)
 Siblings
 Older brother: Jo Byeong-gwi (조병귀, 趙秉龜)
 Adoptive nephew: Jo Seong-ha (조성하, 趙成夏); second son of Jo Byeong-joon (조병준, 趙秉駿) and grandson of Jo Won-yeong (조원영, 趙原永)
 Older brother: Jo Byeong-gu (조병구, 趙秉龜) (1801 - 1845)
 Younger brother: Jo Byeong-gi ( 조병기, 趙秉夔) (1821 - 1858); became the adoptive son of his uncle Jo In-yeong (조인영, 趙寅永) (1782 - 1850)
 Adoptive nephew: Jo Yeong-ha (조영하, 趙寧夏) (June 1845 - 5 December 1884); second son of Jo Byeong-seok (조병석, 趙秉錫)
 Adoptive niece-in-law: Lady Yi of the Yongin Yi clan (증 정경부인 용인 이씨); daughter of Yi Gyo-hyeon (이교현, 李敎鉉)
 Adoptive niece-in-law: Yi Jeong-suk (이정숙, 李貞淑), Lady Yi of the Jeonju Yi clan (정경부인 전주 이씨); daughter of Yi Hae-seok (이해석, 李海錫) (1858 - 1935)
 Adoptive Great-Grandnephew: Jo Dong-yun (조동윤, 趙東潤) (1871 - 1923) 
 Younger sister: Lady Jo of the Pungyang Jo clan (본관: 풍양 조씨, 豊壤 趙氏)
 Brother-in-law: Yi In-seol (이인설, 李寅卨) of the Jeonju Yi clan (본관: 전주 이씨, 全州 李氏)
 Younger sister: Lady Jo of the Pungyang Jo clan (본관: 풍양 조씨, 豊壤 趙氏) (? - 1865)
 Brother-in-law: Yu Chi-seon (유치선, 兪致善) of the Gigye Yu clan (본관: 기계 유씨, 杞溪 兪氏)
 Adoptive nephew: Yu Jin-hak (유진학); the maternal grandfather of Empress Sunjeong
 Younger sister: Lady Jo of the Pungyang Jo clan (본관: 풍양 조씨, 豊壤 趙氏)
 Brother-in-law: Kim Seok-hyeon (김석현, 金奭鉉) of the Gwangsan Kim clan (본관: 광산 김씨, 光山 金氏)
 Husband
 Yi Yeong, Crown Prince Hyomyeong (18 September 1809 - 25 June 1830) (이영 효명세자)
 Mother-in-law: Queen Sunwon of the Andong Kim clan (순원왕후 김씨) (8 June 1789 - 21 September 1857)
 Father-in-law: Yi Gong, King Sunjo (조선 순조) (29 July 1790 - 13 December 1834)
 Issue
 Son: Yi Hwan, King Heonjong of Joseon (8 September 1827 – 25 July 1849) (조선 헌종)
 Daughter-in-law: Queen Hyohyeon of the Andong Kim clan (27 April 1828 - 18 October 1843) (효현왕후 김씨) — No issue.
 Daughter-in-law: Queen Hyojeong of the Namyang Hong clan (6 March 1831 – 2 January 1904) (효정왕후 홍씨) — No issue.
 Adoptive son: Yi Myeong-bok, Emperor Gojong of Korea (8 September 1852 - 21 January 1919) (광무태황제)
 Adoptive daughter-in-law: Min Ja-yeong, Empress Myeongseong of the Yeoheung Min clan (17 November 1851 - 8 October 1895) (명성태황후 민씨)

In popular culture
 Portrayed by Kim Yong-rim in the 2001-2002 KBS2 TV series Empress Myeongseong.
 Portrayed by Jung Hye-sun in the 2012 MBC TV series Dr. Jin.
 Portrayed by Chae Soo-bin in the 2016 KBS2 TV series Love in the Moonlight.
 Portrayed by Kim Bo Yun in the 2020 TV series King Maker: The Change of Destiny.
 Portrayed by Jo Yeon-hee in the 2020 tvN TV series Mr. Queen.

References

External links

https://thetalkingcupboard.com/joseon/royal-ladies-of-joseon-dynasty/

1809 births
1890 deaths
19th-century women rulers
Regents of Korea
Royal consorts of the Joseon dynasty
Korean queens consort
Pungyang Jo clan